Tihana Abrlić, married Jurić, (born 11 July 1976 in Zagreb, SFR Yugoslavia) is a Croatian female professional basketball player.

Personal life
Tihana is a wife of Croatian basketball player Miro Jurić.

References

External links
Profile at eurobasket.com

1976 births
Living people
Basketball players from Zagreb
Croatian women's basketball players
Centers (basketball)
Croatian Women's Basketball League players
Mediterranean Games gold medalists for Croatia
Mediterranean Games medalists in basketball
Competitors at the 1997 Mediterranean Games